Eleanor Mills (born 1970) is a British journalist formerly associated with The Sunday Times and The Times. She was the editorial director of The Sunday Times and editor of its magazine until March 2020. Mills was employed by Times Newspapers for 22 years.

Born and raised in Camden, north London, she is the daughter of the corporate solicitor David Mills from his first marriage. She was educated at St Paul's Girls' and Westminster schools. Mills read English at Brasenose College, Oxford, from 1989.

After graduating from Oxford University in 1992, Mills' first job was on Tank World magazine, a publication which covered the transportation of liquids. She later trained at The Observer, the only female trainee in the newsroom at that time.

Mills joined The Sunday Times in 1998 from The Daily Telegraph, where she was their youngest ever features editor at 26. She became editor of the Saturday edition of The Times in August 2008, replacing George Brock, but returned to the Sunday title as associate editor, and a columnist, less than a year later. Editorial director of The Sunday Times since June 2012, she became the editor of The Sunday Times Magazine (in succession to Sarah Baxter) in September 2015. Mills left her roles Sunday Times magazine editor and editorial director in March 2020.

She co-edited (with Kira Cochrane) Cupcakes and Kalashnikovs: 100 Years of the Best Journalism by Women, published as Journalistas: 100 Years of the Best Writing and Reporting by Women Journalists in the United States. Mills succeeded Jane Martinson as chair of the Women in Journalism campaigning group at the end of 2013. She left this role in 2021, and was succeeded by Daily Mirror editor Alison Phillips.

On 8 March 2021, International Women's Day, Mills launched Noon, an online media platform and community for middle-aged women. "Older women are very much the demographic the mainstream media forgot; one of the last bastions for diversity", she wrote in a blog post for the Society of Editors. In late March 2021, she resigned from the Board of the Society of Editors because of its response to a statement from the organisation's (now former) Executive director who had claimed the British media was not racist. It had been disputed by Mills and others when issued earlier in the month.

Mills is married with two daughters.

Bibliography
  (US edition:

References

External links
 Official website

1970 births
Living people
British journalists
British magazine editors
The Daily Telegraph people
The Observer people
The Sunday Times people
The Times journalists